Bruno II of Isenburg-Braunsberg was the Count of Isenburg-Braunsberg from 1210 until 1255.

1255 deaths
House of Isenburg
Counts of Wied
Year of birth unknown